Visnes is a small village in Hustadvika Municipality in Møre og Romsdal county, Norway.

Visnes is home to Visnes Kalk AS, a limestone quarry.

References

External links
 Visnes Kalk AS

Hustadvika (municipality)
Villages in Møre og Romsdal